The Indian locomotive class WAP-6 is a class of 25 kV AC electric locomotives that was developed in the mid-1990s by Chittaranjan Locomotive Works for Indian Railways. The model name stands for broad gauge (W), AC Current (A), Passenger traffic (P), 6th generation (6) locomotive. They entered service in April 1996. A total of 17 WAP-6 units were built at CLW between 1995 and 1998.

The WAP-6 were intended to be the faster variant of the successful WAP-4, but failed trials and were restricted to a top speed of 105 km/h. Now all units have been converted to WAP-4 specifications. All were homed at Asansol (ASN) shed but after conversion reallocated to Howrah (HWH) shed.

History 

This class  was actually  variant of the WAP-4 design where Co-Co Flexicoil Mark 1 cast bogies of the usual WAP4 was replaced by Fabricated Flexicoil Mark IV bogies. All other specifications were same as WAP4. WAP-1 unit no. 22212 was the first to be rebuilt into a WAP-6. It was provided with Flexicoil bogies and other upgrades. Then it was rebuilt into WAP-4. Later, more WAP-1 units were re-geared and provided with high-adhesion fabricated bogies (Flexicoil Mark IV) which are somewhat similar to ALCO hi-adhesion bogies. Two units,i.e., 22406 and 22408 are upgraded with better wheel-sets. This class was an unsuccessful one. All have been converted back as WAP-4. About 16 of these were built (All in the number series 22400–22416.).

Technical specifications

Hauling capacity
If the average weight of ICF coaches is 55 tonnes then:

* Except One all the locomotives are rebuild back to wap-4.

See also

 Indian Railways 
Locomotives of India
Rail transport in India

References

'

Electric locomotives of India
25 kV AC locomotives
Co-Co locomotives
5 ft 6 in gauge locomotives
Railway locomotives introduced in 1997